Jombang Station (JG) is a large class type C railway station located in Jombatan, Jombang, Jombang Regency, the station is included in the Operation Area VII Madiun at an altitude of +43 m. The location of this station is right across the Alun-alun Jombang. All trains passing the - must stop at this station.

Building and layout
Jombang Station initially had nine train lines with line 2 being a straight line, but only lines 1–3 were used frequently. The old line 4 has been dismantled to expand the middle platform, leaving only eight lanes. In addition, a new canopy was added to cover the new line 4 and the old electric signaling system (Ansaldo type) has been replaced with the latest electric signaling produced by PT Len Industri.

This station is equipped with a waiting room (there is an executive waiting room) and a platform that is high enough to make it easier for passengers to get on and off the train.

From this station, there used to be a fork to the north from line 1 to Ploso – Babat and from the old line 5 to  via .

Services
The following is a list of train services at the Jombang Station.

Passenger services 
 Executive class
 Mixed class
 Anjasmoro, from and to  via --- (executive-economy plus).
 Premium economy class
 Economy class
 Local economy

Freight services

Incidents

 On 14 January 1997 at 4.30, three train carriages carrying fuel - possibly in being pulled by locomotive Krupp-M1500BB (BB301 22) - rolled 800 meters west of Jombang Station after hitting an embankment. As a result, BBM (Bahan Bakar Minyak) (consisting of diesel fuel and premium fuel) spilled and flowed into the Bokrantai River, then caught fire. One resident was killed, while the machinist and kernet suffered burns. The journey of a number of trains was hampered by this incident.
 On 27 November 2007, the locomotive and one Bangunkarta train plunged 300 meters west of Jombang Station. There were no fatalities in this incident, but the train journey had to be delayed until evening.
 On 14 August 2010, there was a wessel error so that the GE U20C (CC203 20) locomotive that was pulling the Rapih Dhoho train entered the Badug track and fell into the fields. There were no casualties in this incident.

References

External links

Jombang Regency
Railway stations in East Java
Railway stations opened in 1881
1881 establishments in the Dutch East Indies